Joseph James Green (29 October 1870 – 1940) was an English footballer who played in the Football League for Derby County.

References

1870 births
1940 deaths
English footballers
Association football goalkeepers
English Football League players
Derby County F.C. players
Belper Town F.C. players